The BSA C12 was a British pre-unit motorcycle manufactured by the Birmingham Small Arms Company from 1956 to 1958.

The C12 used the same engine as the earlier C11G with the four-speed gearbox, but in a more modern chassis featuring a swinging arm rear suspension. Minor engine modifications meant it was also far more reliable.

References

C12
Single-cylinder motorcycles